German submarine U-1307 was a Type VIIC/41 U-boat of Nazi Germany's Kriegsmarine during World War II.

She was ordered on 1 August 1942, and was laid down on 2 December 1943, at Flensburger Schiffbau-Gesellschaft, Flensburg, as yard number 500. She was launched on 29 September 1944, and commissioned under the command of Oberleutnant zur See Hans Buscher on 17 November 1944.

Design
German Type VIIC/41 submarines were preceded by the heavier Type VIIC submarines. U-1307 had a displacement of  when at the surface and  while submerged. She had two shafts and two  propellers.

U-1307 was fitted with five  torpedo tubes (four fitted at the bow and one at the stern), fourteen torpedoes, one  SK C/35 naval gun, (220 rounds), one  Flak M42 and two  C/30 anti-aircraft guns. The boat had a complement of between forty-four and fifty-two.

Sensors

Passive sonar
U-1307 was one of only ten Type VIICs to be fitted with a Balkongerät (literally 'Balcony apparatus or equipment'). The Balkongerät was standard on the Type XXI and the Type XXIII. Nonetheless, it was also fitted to several Type IXs and one Type X. The Balkongerät was an improved version of Gruppenhorchgerät (GHG) (group listening device). The GHG had 24 hydrophones, the Balkongerät had 48 hydrophones and improved electronics, which enabled more accurate readings to be taken.

Service history
On 9 May 1945, U-1307 surrendered at Bergen, Norway. She was later transferred to Loch Ryan, Scotland on 2 June 1945. Of the 156 U-boats that eventually surrendered to the Allied forces at the end of the war, U-1307 was one of 116 selected to take part in Operation Deadlight. U-1307 was towed out and sank on 9 December 1945, by rockets from a British Firefly aircraft launched from the escort carrier .

See also
 Battle of the Atlantic

References

Bibliography

German Type VIIC/41 submarines
U-boats commissioned in 1944
World War II submarines of Germany
1944 ships
Ships built in Flensburg
Maritime incidents in December 1945
World War II shipwrecks in the Atlantic Ocean
Operation Deadlight
U-boats sunk by British aircraft
Submarines sunk by aircraft as targets